John Alfred Baden (May 10, 1913 - April 26, 1983) was an American prelate who served as the Suffragan Bishop of Virginia from 1973 till 1979.

Early life and education
Baden was born in Washington, D.C. on May 10, 1913, the son of John Alfred Baden and Marian Sturgis. He was educated at the Maryland Park High School and then proceeded to the University of Maryland from where he graduated with a Bachelor of Science in 1939 and a Bachelor of Laws from the National University School of Law in 1939. He married Jean Deloris Feaga on July 11, 1942, and together had three children. Later he trained for the priesthood at the Virginia Theological Seminary and graduated with a Master of Divinity in 1948. The Virginia seminary awarded him a Doctor of Divinity in 1972.

Ordained Ministry
Baden was ordained deacon on December 23, 1947, by Bishop Noble C. Powell of Maryland in Trinity Church, Towson, Maryland. He was then ordained priest by the same bishop in December 1948. He served in Trinity Church, Towson, Maryland from 1946 till 1948 and then became rector of St James' Church in Monkton, Maryland and St James' Mission in Parkton, Maryland. In 1958 he became Diocesan Missioner and Executive Secretary of the Department of Missions 
of the Diocese of Virginia, a post he retained till 1962. Subsequently, between 1959 and 1962, he also served as Archdeacon of Virginia. 
He served as rector of Frederick Parish responsible of Christ Church and St Paul's-on-the-Hill in Winchester, Virginia between 1962 and 1973.

Bishop
Baden was elected Bishop of Northern Michigan on January 8, 1964, on the seventh ballot, however he declined the election. He was then elected Suffragan Bishop of Virginia in 1973, which he accepted. He was consecrated on June 30, 1973, in Washington National Cathedral by Bishop Robert F. Gibson Jr. of Virginia. During his time as bishop he was involved in assisting Anglican churches in Tanzania and Uganda, when in fact he visited Tanzania in 1975. He retired in 1979.

References

1913 births
1983 deaths
20th-century American Episcopalians
Episcopal bishops of Virginia
20th-century American clergy